The Euro-Asia Masters Challenge was an invitational professional non-ranking snooker tournament which ran for three editions.

History
In August 2003, the tournament was first held as a two-legged event. Featuring eight players across the two legs, the first leg was played in Wan Chai, Hong Kong, with James Wattana defeating Ken Doherty in the final to win the £30,000 prize. Wattana defeated Stephen Hendry in 5–1 in the semi-final, with Doherty defeating Mark Williams by the same scoreline in the second semi-final.

In the second leg played in Bangkok, Thailand, Doherty was victorious defeating Marco Fu in the final. Doherty defeated Ding Junhui 5–4 in his semi-final, while Fu had defeated Jimmy White 5–3 in the other semi.

The tournament was revived in 2007, with the addition of a team tournament. In the singles event John Higgins defeating James Wattana in the final in Hong Kong to take the £25,000 prize.

Winners

References

Euro-Asia Masters Challenge
Snooker non-ranking competitions
Defunct snooker competitions